Barstow-Daggett Airport  is a county-owned public airport in San Bernardino County, California, United States. It is five miles (7 km) east of Daggett and 14 miles east of Barstow. Built in 1933, it is the oldest of the six airports operated by San Bernardino County.

Facilities and aircraft 
It has two asphalt runways: 8/26 is 6,402 by 150 feet (1,951 x 46 m) and 4/22 is 5,123 by 100 feet (1,561 x 30 m).

In the year ending February 16, 2006, the airport had 36,500 aircraft operations, an average of 100 per day: 51% general aviation and 49% military. 59 aircraft were then based at this airport: 32% single-engine, 3% multi-engine, 1.7% jet, 2% helicopter, 2% ultralight and 59% military.

History
Just prior to World War II, the Civil Aeronautics Administration (CAA) selected the site as an important civil air field and negotiated a standard agreement (AP 4) with the county of San Bernardino to maintain the air field. Shortly thereafter, the site was chosen by the War Department as a Modification Center. As a result, the county acquired fee interest to the additional land necessary for War Department use. On 4 May 1942, the government entered into an agreement with the county to lease the 1,099-acre site (renewable annually but not beyond 30 June 1967).

About 29 May 1942 the government and Douglas Aircraft Company, Inc., entered into a cost plus fixed fee ($1.00) contract (No. W-509-ENG-2557), whereby Douglas agreed to do all things necessary and incident to the procurement, furnishing, delivery and installation of equipment, machinery, machine tools, materials, supplies and facilities for proper operation of a Modification Center. Douglas established the Modification Center and operated it until the middle of 1944, when Army Air Forces deactivated the project. According to a narrative report contained in project files, there was no evidence of the lease ever having been executed, so it was believed that Douglas occupied and used the premises without any written agreement.

On 12 November 1942, the Secretary of War and Standard Oil Co. (San Francisco) entered into an agreement (unnumbered lease to run with lease W-868-ENG-4504), whereby Standard Oil agreed to install, operate, and maintain lubricating oil storage and distribution facilities at the site. In addition, on 20 December 1943, the CAA was granted a permit (to run with Lease No. W-868-ENG-4505) to use and occupy two parcels of land totaling 11.2 acres at the Modification Center for a radio range and communication building site, together with a right of way between the two parcels for establishing and maintaining subsurface cable lines. The original permit period ended 30 June 1944, however, the lease contained a provision for annual renewal, at the option of the government, through 30 June 1967. Upon the expiration of the permit, all CAA property was to have been removed to a condition satisfactory to the Commanding Office or other competent military authority.

About 65 buildings and 20 other structures were built at the facility (headquarters and flight operations buildings, hangars, barracks, sewage treatment plants, warehouses, water wells, water and fuel storage tanks, gasoline station, etc.). The total cost of government improvements was $3,924,273, with the CAA expending an additional $107,235 for various improvements. Douglas built a swimming pool, paint and dope storage shed, and an air hose station for which reimbursement was not made. According to airport personnel, improvements constructed by the county (non-DOD) consisted of one building, and the addition of a small surface water pond in the vicinity.

On 25 September 1945, Major General Willis H. Hale, Fourth Air Force, notified Daggett Army Air Field that it was temporarily inactivated.

The site (all 1,099 acres) was classified as surplus on 15 November 1945. According to the completed Declaration of Surplus Real Property Form (SPB 5, dated 28 March 1946), the improvements at the site were in good condition. Custody and accountability for the site was assumed by the War Assets Administration on 27 June 1946, with the installation immediately transferred to the Navy Department.

The San Bernardino Daily Sun reported on 21 August 1951 that the lease between the county and the Marine Corps on the Daggett Airport had been renewed by the board of supervisors on 20 August.

According to airport personnel interviewed during the site visit, the county obtained control of facility from the military in 1958. However, a fire during the 1960s destroyed County records of the transaction. During 1946 through 1958 it is not clear which agency and jurisdiction over the facility. From 1958 through the present, the airport was controlled by the current owner, the county. According to Exhibit A of the original 1942 lease with the county, the government, at its option, may leave in place the alterations and improvements made to the landing areas in lieu of restoration.

Today the US Army has based several UH-60 Black Hawk helicopters and LUH-72 Lakota helicopters operating out of the airport under the Fort Irwin National Training Center aviation company which is based on Fort Irwin.

See also

 California World War II Army Airfields
Victorville Army Airfield auxiliary fields

References

External links
San Bernardino County Department of Airports: Barstow-Daggett Airport
Historical record of balloons launched from the airport in the early 1990s
Airport history from Daggett Aviation

1943 establishments in California
Airports in San Bernardino County, California
Military facilities in the Mojave Desert
Airports established in 1943
World War II airfields in the United States
Airfields of the United States Army Air Forces in California
Historic American Engineering Record in California